Paul Hänni (18 September 1927 – 19 December 2020) was a Swiss wrestler. He competed at the 1952 Summer Olympics and the 1960 Summer Olympics.

References

External links
 

1927 births
2020 deaths
Swiss male sport wrestlers
Olympic wrestlers of Switzerland
Wrestlers at the 1952 Summer Olympics
Wrestlers at the 1960 Summer Olympics
People from Bremgarten District
Sportspeople from Aargau